Edwin 'Ted' Lees (born 30 March 1948) is a former Australian rules footballer who played with Melbourne in the Victorian Football League (VFL) during the 1960s.

Lees played for Assumption College alongside future Hawthorn star Peter Crimmins before joining the University Blacks. A follower, he was recruited to Melbourne in 1967 and appeared in the opening two rounds, but didn't play again that season. The following year he kicked three goals in games against both Fitzroy and Collingwood.

The next stage of Lees career took place in Tasmania where he played in the North West Football Union with Devonport. He was a member of Trevor Leo's Tasmanian team at the 1969 Adelaide Carnival.

References

1948 births
Melbourne Football Club players
Devonport Football Club players
University Blacks Football Club players
Living people
Australian rules footballers from Victoria (Australia)